Really Wild Animals is an American children's nature series, hosted by Dudley Moore as Spin, an anthropomorphic globe. Comprising 13 episodes, it was released between October 24, 1993, and March 6, 1996.  It was nominated for five national Daytime Emmy Awards and won one.

Released by the National Geographic Society, the series educates children about many different species of animals. It goes to every continent, describing the wildlife on each one and also focuses on one specific group of animals, such as dogs, cats, endangered animals and animals of the African savannah.

Songs were written, produced, and mostly performed by Alan O'Day and Janis Liebhart. At the end of an episode, Spin says, "But (you know), there are lots more Really Wild Animals all across this wonderful world of ours, so be sure to join me on our next (exciting) adventure. Until then, this is your pal Spin. Spin ya later!"

Episodes
The series was released on VHS and on August 2, 2005, National Geographic began releasing the episodes on DVD.

Notes

Television series about mammals
Television series about birds
Television series about fish
Television series about reptiles and amphibians
American television series with live action and animation
1990s American children's television series
1990s American documentary television series
American children's education television series
Nature educational television series
National Geographic (American TV channel) original programming
1993 American television series debuts
1996 American television series endings